René Solís Peña (July 25, 1925 – September 21, 2013) was a baseball pitcher who played in the minor leagues, for the Cuba national baseball team and in the Cuban League.

Minor league career
He played in the minor leagues from 1948 to 1952 and from 1954 to 1957, going 87-70 in 244 games. He pitched in the Brooklyn Dodgers system from 1948 to 1952, the New York Yankees system in 1955 and the Cincinnati Reds system from 1955 to 1956. He was with unaffiliated teams in 1954 and in Mexico in 1957.

In 1949, with the Miami Sun Sox, he was 20-9 with a 2.98 ERA in 39 games.

Cuban national team
He was a member of the Cuban team that won a bronze medal in the 1946 Central American and Caribbean Games, earning a victory in the competition.

Cuban league career
He pitched for Almendares from 1948 to 1950–1951. He joined Cienfuegos partway through the winter of 1950–1951 and finished the season there. He returned to Cuban league play in 1954–1955 for the first time in three seasons, pitching briefly for Cienfuegos.

As a member of Almendares, he won a game in the 1949 Caribbean Series. He was also on the Almendares squad for the 1950 Caribbean Series, but did not pitch in the series.

He was born in Victoria de las Tunas Cuba and died the U.S. state of Florida at the age of 88.

References

A History of Cuban Baseball by Peter Bjarkman
Cuban Baseball: A Statistical History by Jorge Figueredo

1925 births
2013 deaths
People from Las Tunas (city)
Cuban baseball players
Minor league baseball players
Central American and Caribbean Games bronze medalists for Cuba
Competitors at the 1946 Central American and Caribbean Games
Greenwood Dodgers players
Greenville Spinners players
Mobile Bears players
Fort Worth Cats players
Miami Sun Sox players
West Palm Beach Indians players
Carlsbad Potashers players
High Point-Thomasville Hi-Toms players
Winston-Salem Twins players
Central American and Caribbean Games medalists in baseball